Qunli station is a station on the suburban Line S7 of the Nanjing Metro. It commenced operations along with the rest of the line on 26 May 2018.

References

External links

Railway stations in China opened in 2018
Nanjing Metro stations